Start Liquidation is a 1983 Soviet action film directed by Boris Grigoryev.

Plot 
The film takes place in the spring of 1945 in Western Belarus, where the brutal gang of Boleslav Kruk creates chaos. They kill, rob and set fire to collective farm lands. They plan to get to Moscow. Lieutenant Colonel Ivan Danilov is trying to deal with them.

Cast 
 Oleg Strizhenov as Ivan Danilov
 Mikhail Zhigalov as Mikhail Nikitin
 Vasily Lanovoy as Vadim Chistyakov / Altunin
 Valeri Vojtyuk as Sergey Belov
 Georgiy Yumatov as Serebrovskiy
 Nadezhda Butyrtseva as Larisa Anatolievna
 Aleksandr Filippenko as Andrey Blinov 'Kopchyonyy'
 Olga Sirina as Zoya Litovskaya
 Vladimir Gusev as Valka-Krest
 Leonid Belozorovich as Tokmakov

References

External links 
 

1983 films
1980s Russian-language films
Soviet action films
1983 action films
Eastern Front of World War II films
Films set in 1945
Films set in Belarus